The 2009–10 Pittsburgh Penguins season was the 43rd season of the franchise in the National Hockey League (NHL). The Penguins entered the season as defending Stanley Cup champions. It was scheduled to be the last season with the Penguins' home venue as Mellon Arena before they moved into their new arena, the Consol Energy Center, which was being constructed adjacent to the Mellon Arena across Centre Avenue.

The regular season began with a home game against the New York Rangers in which the Penguins held a banner-raising ceremony beforehand.

The Penguins qualified for the playoffs for the fourth consecutive season. They did not become champions of the Atlantic Division, but nonetheless finished in fourth place in the Eastern Conference with 101 points. They began the 2010 Stanley Cup playoffs on April 14 against the Ottawa Senators. They beat the Senators but they were upset in the Eastern Conference Semi-finals by the Montreal Canadiens, losing in seven games.

Pre-season

|-  style="text-align:center; background:#cfc;"
| 1 || September 15 || Columbus Blue Jackets || 4–5 || Pittsburgh Penguins || OT || Fleury || 15,766 || 1–0–0 || Recap
|-  style="text-align:center; background:#fcf;"
| 2 || September 18||Toronto Maple Leafs||4–3||Pittsburgh Penguins||||Johnson||16,621||1–1–0|| Recap
|-  style="text-align:center; background:#fcf;"
| 3 || September 21||Pittsburgh Penguins||3–4||Montreal Canadiens||||Curry||21,273||1–2–0|| Recap
|-  style="text-align:center; background:#ffc;"
| 4 || September 22||Pittsburgh Penguins||2–3||Toronto Maple Leafs||SO||Johnson||18,910||1–2–1|| Recap
|-  style="text-align:center; background:#fcf;"
| 5 || September 24||Pittsburgh Penguins||2–5||Columbus Blue Jackets||||Fleury||12,638||1–3–1|| Recap
|-  style="text-align:center; background:#fcf;"
| 6 || September 27||Pittsburgh Penguins||1–4||Detroit Red Wings||||Fleury||13,891||1–4–1|| Recap
|-

|- style="text-align:center;"
| Legend:       = Win       = Loss       = OT/SO Loss

Regular season

First half: October to December
The Penguins began the 2009–10 season on Friday, October 2. Prior to the game the team raised the Stanley Cup banner at Mellon Arena. The ceremonial banner raising was shown on a video board outside Mellon Arena, which displayed highlights from the previous season during the days leading up the game. The Penguins won their opening night game over the New York Rangers and defeated the New York Islanders the following night. After their first loss of the season to the Phoenix Coyotes, the Penguins embarked on a four-game road trip to complete a series of five games in eight days. The Penguins swept the four game road trip, setting a new franchise record for consecutive road wins to start a season. The Penguins extended their overall win-streak to seven games by winning the first three games of their ensuing homestand; the win-streak ended with a loss to the New Jersey Devils on October 24.

The Penguins began November with a three-game road trip in California. After defeating the Anaheim Ducks, the Penguins lost their first back-to-back games of the season to the Los Angeles Kings and the San Jose Sharks. The team then lost to the Boston Bruins and New Jersey Devils. During the four-game losing streak, the Penguins were outscored 17–3. Against the Bruins, Sidney Crosby did not score a point for the fifth-consecutive game, the longest point-drought of his career. The Penguins ended their skid with a 6–5 overtime victory against Boston on November 14. Bill Guerin tied the game with .04 second left, and Pascal Dupuis scored in overtime.

Extended injuries hindered the team throughout much of the early season. On November 16, the Penguins played without four of the six defenceman that had started with the team. Additionally, they were without forwards Tyler Kennedy, Maxime Talbot and Chris Kunitz. Evgeni Malkin had also missed significant time. Later in the week, it was announced that defenceman Jay McKee would miss two to four weeks, but that Sergei Gonchar and Maxime Talbot, who had surgery during the off-season, would both likely return on November 19.

In late December through January 1, rosters for the 2010 Winter Olympics in Vancouver were announced, and five Penguins were selected. Malkin and Gonchar were selected to play for Russia, Sidney Crosby and Marc-Andre Fleury for Canada and Brooks Orpik for the United States.

The Penguins concluded the first half of their season with their 41st game on December 30 against the New Jersey Devils. Through the first 41 games, the Penguins earned a 26–14–1 record. While the Penguins won five straight in the middle of the month, they ending losing three in a row, and four of their last five, including shutouts of 0–2 and 0–4 to the Devils. The 0–4 shutout earned Devils' goalie Martin Brodeur his 104th career shutout and the NHL record.

Second half: January to April
The Penguins began the second half of their season with their 42nd game on January 2 against the Tampa Bay Lightning. The Penguins went on to lose both of their first two games of the second half of the season with the second coming against the Florida Panthers. The Penguins then returned home for a two-game home stand in which they split by first defeating the Atlanta Thrashers and then losing in a high scoring 7–4 contest to the Philadelphia Flyers. After the home stand, the Penguins embarked on a five-game road trip of Canada and Minnesota, in which they finished the trip with a decent 3–2 record with wins coming against the Toronto Maple Leafs, Calgary Flames and Edmonton Oilers. They battled with a struggling New Jersey Devils team for the Atlantic Division title, but ultimately fell short due in large part to having lost all six divisional games against the Devils. The Penguins had a 21–14–6 record in the second half of the season, placing them in fourth place in the Eastern Conference (despite having the third-best points total). It would be the third time in four years that the Penguins had over 100 points in a season (having missed out by a single point the previous year) and the fourth-straight year with 45 wins or more.

Game log

|- style="background:#cfc;"
| 1 || 2 || 7:30 PM || New York Rangers || 2–3 || Pittsburgh Penguins || Mellon Arena (17,132) || 1–0–0 || 2
|- style="background:#cfc;"
| 2 || 3 || 7:00 PM || Pittsburgh Penguins || 4–3 SO || New York Islanders || Nassau Veterans Memorial Coliseum (16,234) || 2–0–0 || 4
|- style="background:#fcf;"
| 3 || 7 || 7:30 PM || Phoenix Coyotes || 3–0 || Pittsburgh Penguins || Mellon Arena (16,975) || 2–1–0 || 4
|- style="background:#cfc;"
| 4 || 8 || 7:00 PM || Pittsburgh Penguins || 5–4 || Philadelphia Flyers || Wells Fargo Center (19,611) || 3–1–0 || 6
|- style="background:#cfc;"
| 5 || 10 || 7:00 PM || Pittsburgh Penguins || 5–2 || Toronto Maple Leafs || Air Canada Centre (19,374) || 4–1–0 || 8
|- style="background:#cfc;"
| 6 || 12 || 7:30 PM || Pittsburgh Penguins || 4–1 || Ottawa Senators || Scotiabank Place (17,014) || 5–1–0 || 10
|- style="background:#cfc;"
| 7 || 14 || 7:00 PM || Pittsburgh Penguins || 3–2 SO || Carolina Hurricanes || RBC Center (14,053) || 6–1–0 || 12
|- style="background:#cfc;"
| 8 || 17 || 7:30 PM || Tampa Bay Lightning || 1–4 || Pittsburgh Penguins || Mellon Arena (17,132) || 7–1–0 || 14
|- style="background:#cfc;"
| 9 || 20 || 7:00 PM || St. Louis Blues || 1–5 || Pittsburgh Penguins || Mellon Arena (17,132) || 8–1–0 || 16
|- style="background:#cfc;"
| 10 || 23 || 7:30 PM || Florida Panthers || 2–3 SO || Pittsburgh Penguins || Mellon Arena (16,971) || 9–1–0 || 18
|- style="background:#fcf;"
| 11 || 24 || 7:30 PM || New Jersey Devils || 4–1 || Pittsburgh Penguins || Mellon Arena (17,132) || 9–2–0 || 18
|- style="background:#cfc;"
| 12 || 28 || 7:30 PM || Montreal Canadiens || 1–6 || Pittsburgh Penguins || Mellon Arena (16,965) || 10–2–0 || 20
|- style="background:#cfc;"
| 13 || 30 || 7:00 PM || Pittsburgh Penguins || 4–3 SO || Columbus Blue Jackets || Nationwide Arena (19,136) || 11–2–0 || 22
|- style="background:#fcf;"
| 14 || 31 || 7:30 PM || Minnesota Wild || 2–1 || Pittsburgh Penguins || Mellon Arena (16,960) || 11–3–0 || 22
|-

|- style="background:#cfc;"
| 15 || 3 || 10:00 PM || Pittsburgh Penguins || 4–3 || Anaheim Ducks || Honda Center (16,128) || 12–3–0 || 24
|- style="background:#fcf;"
| 16 || 5 || 10:30 PM || Pittsburgh Penguins || 2–5 || Los Angeles Kings || Staples Center (18,118) || 12–4–0 || 24
|- style="background:#fcf;"
| 17 || 7 || 10:30 PM || Pittsburgh Penguins || 0–5 || San Jose Sharks || HP Pavilion at San Jose (17,562) || 12–5–0 || 24
|- style="background:#fcf;"
| 18 || 10 || 7:00 PM || Pittsburgh Penguins || 0–3 || Boston Bruins || TD Garden (17,565) || 12–6–0 || 24
|- style="background:#fcf;"
| 19 || 12 || 7:30 PM || New Jersey Devils || 4–1 || Pittsburgh Penguins || Mellon Arena (17,005) || 12–7–0 || 24
|- style="background:#cfc;"
| 20 || 14 || 7:30 PM || Boston Bruins || 5–6 OT || Pittsburgh Penguins || Mellon Arena (17,132) || 13–7–0 || 26
|- style="background:#cfc;"
| 21 || 16 || 7:30 PM || Anaheim Ducks || 2–5 || Pittsburgh Penguins || Mellon Arena (17,052) || 14–7–0 || 28
|- style="background:#fcf;"
| 22 || 19 || 7:30 PM || Pittsburgh Penguins || 2–6 || Ottawa Senators || Scotiabank Place (17,039) || 14–8–0 || 28
|- style="background:#cfc;"
| 23 || 21 || 7:00 PM || Pittsburgh Penguins || 3–2 || Atlanta Thrashers || Philips Arena (17,588) || 15–8–0 || 30
|- style="background:#cfc;"
| 24 || 23 || 7:30 PM || Pittsburgh Penguins || 3–2 OT || Florida Panthers || BankAtlantic Center (17,024) || 16–8–0 || 32
|- style="background:#cfc;"
| 25 || 25 || 7:30 PM || Montreal Canadiens || 1–3 || Pittsburgh Penguins || Mellon Arena (17,094) || 17–8–0 || 34
|- style="background:#fcf;"
| 26 || 27 || 2:00 PM || Pittsburgh Penguins || 2–3 || New York Islanders || Nassau Veterans Memorial Coliseum (15,262) || 17–9–0 || 34
|- style="background:#cfc;"
| 27 || 28 || 7:30 PM || New York Rangers || 3–8 || Pittsburgh Penguins || Mellon Arena (17,122) || 18–9–0 || 36
|- style="background:#cfc;"
| 28 || 30 || 7:00 PM || Pittsburgh Penguins || 5–2 || New York Rangers || Madison Square Garden (IV) (18,200) || 19–9–0 || 38
|-

|- style="background:#cfc;"
| 29 || 3 || 7:30 PM || Colorado Avalanche || 1–4 || Pittsburgh Penguins || Mellon Arena (16,968) || 20–9–0 || 40
|- style="background:#ffc;"
| 30 || 5 || 7:30 PM || Chicago Blackhawks || 2–1 OT || Pittsburgh Penguins || Mellon Arena (17,132) || 20–9–1 || 41
|- style="background:#fcf;"
| 31 || 7 || 7:30 PM || Carolina Hurricanes || 3–2 || Pittsburgh Penguins || Mellon Arena (16,964) || 20–10–1 || 41
|- style="background:#cfc;"
| 32 || 10 || 7:30 PM || Pittsburgh Penguins || 3–2 || Montreal Canadiens || Bell Centre (21,273) || 21–10–1 || 43
|- style="background:#cfc;"
| 33 || 12 || 7:30 PM || Florida Panthers || 2–3 OT || Pittsburgh Penguins || Mellon Arena (16,977) || 22–10–1 || 45
|- style="background:#cfc;"
| 34 || 15 || 7:00 PM || Philadelphia Flyers || 1–6 || Pittsburgh Penguins || Mellon Arena (17,086) || 23–10–1 || 47
|- style="background:#cfc;"
| 35 || 17 || 7:00 PM || Pittsburgh Penguins || 3–2 SO || Philadelphia Flyers || Wachovia Center (19,689) || 24–10–1 || 49
|- style="background:#cfc;"
| 36 || 19 || 7:00 PM || Pittsburgh Penguins || 2–1 SO || Buffalo Sabres || HSBC Arena (18,690) || 25–10–1 || 51
|- style="background:#fcf;"
| 37 || 21 || 7:30 PM || New Jersey Devils || 4–0 || Pittsburgh Penguins || Mellon Arena (17,132) || 25–11–1 || 51
|- style="background:#cfc;"
| 38 || 23 || 7:00 PM || Ottawa Senators || 2–8 || Pittsburgh Penguins || Mellon Arena (17,132) || 26–11–1 || 53
|- style="background:#fcf;"
| 39 || 27 || 7:00 PM || Toronto Maple Leafs || 4–3 || Pittsburgh Penguins || Mellon Arena (17,132) || 26–12–1 || 53
|- style="background:#fcf;"
| 40 || 29 || 7:00 PM || Pittsburgh Penguins || 3–4 || Buffalo Sabres || HSBC Arena (18,690) || 26–13–1 || 53
|- style="background:#fcf;"
| 41 || 30 || 7:00 PM || Pittsburgh Penguins || 0–2 || New Jersey Devils || Prudential Center (17,625) || 26–14–1 || 53
|-

|- style="background:#fcf;"
| 42 || 2 || 3:00 PM || Pittsburgh Penguins || 1–3 || Tampa Bay Lightning || St. Pete Times Forum (20,109) || 26–15–1 || 53
|- style="background:#fcf;"
| 43 || 3 || 5:00 PM || Pittsburgh Penguins || 2–6 || Florida Panthers || BankAtlantic Center (18,110) || 26–16–1 || 53
|- style="background:#cfc;"
| 44 || 5 || 7:30 PM || Atlanta Thrashers || 2–5 || Pittsburgh Penguins || Mellon Arena (17,049) || 27–16–1 || 55
|- style="background:#fcf;"
| 45 || 7 || 7:30 PM || Philadelphia Flyers || 7–4 || Pittsburgh Penguins || Mellon Arena (17,095) || 27–17–1 || 55
|- style="background:#cfc;"
| 46 || 9 || 7:00 PM || Pittsburgh Penguins || 4–1 || Toronto Maple Leafs || Air Canada Centre (19,567) || 28–17–1 || 57
|- style="background:#fcf;"
| 47 || 11 || 8:00 PM || Pittsburgh Penguins || 3–4 || Minnesota Wild || Xcel Energy Center (19,044) || 28–18–1 || 57
|- style="background:#cfc;"
| 48 || 13 || 9:30 PM || Pittsburgh Penguins || 3–1 || Calgary Flames || Pengrowth Saddledome (19,289) || 29–18–1 || 59
|- style="background:#cfc;"
| 49 || 14 || 9:30 PM || Pittsburgh Penguins || 3–2 || Edmonton Oilers || Rexall Place (16,839) || 30–18–1 || 61
|- style="background:#fcf;"
| 50 || 16 || 10:00 PM || Pittsburgh Penguins || 2–6 || Vancouver Canucks || Rogers Arena (18,810) || 30–19–1 || 61
|- style="background:#cfc;"
| 51 || 19 || 7:30 PM || New York Islanders || 4–6 || Pittsburgh Penguins || Mellon Arena (16,981) || 31–19–1 || 63
|- style="background:#fcf;"
| 52 || 21 || 7:30 PM || Washington Capitals || 6–3 || Pittsburgh Penguins || Mellon Arena (17,132) || 31–20–1 || 63
|- style="background:#cfc;"
| 53 || 24 || 12:30 PM || Pittsburgh Penguins || 2–1 || Philadelphia Flyers || Wachovia Center (19,798) || 32–20–1 || 65
|- style="background:#cfc;"
| 54 || 25 || 7:00 PM || Pittsburgh Penguins || 4–2 || New York Rangers || Madison Square Garden (IV) (18,200) || 33–20–1 || 67
|- style="background:#fcf;"
| 55 || 28 || 7:00 PM || Ottawa Senators || 4–1 || Pittsburgh Penguins || Mellon Arena (17,084) || 33–21–1 || 67
|- style="background:#cfc;"
| 56 || 31 || 12:30 PM || Detroit Red Wings || 1–2 SO || Pittsburgh Penguins || Mellon Arena (17,105) || 34–21–1 || 69
|-

|- style="background:#cfc;"
| 57 || 1 || 7:00 PM || Buffalo Sabres || 4–5 || Pittsburgh Penguins || Mellon Arena (17,029) || 35–21–1 || 71
|- style="background:#fcf;"
| 58 || 6 || 2:00 PM || Pittsburgh Penguins || 3–5 || Montreal Canadiens || Bell Centre (21,273) || 35–22–1 || 71
|- style="background:#ffc;"
| 59 || 7 || 12:00 PM || Pittsburgh Penguins || 4–5 OT || Washington Capitals || Verizon Center (18,277) || 35–22–2 || 72
|- style="background:#cfc;"
| 60 || 10 || 7:30 PM || New York Islanders || 1–3 || Pittsburgh Penguins || Mellon Arena (16,980) || 36–22–2 || 74
|- style="background:#ffc;"
| 61 || 12 || 7:30 PM || New York Rangers || 3–2 OT || Pittsburgh Penguins || Mellon Arena (17,132) || 36–22–3 || 75
|- style="background:#ffc;"
| 62 || 14 || 1:00 PM || Nashville Predators || 4–3 SO || Pittsburgh Penguins || Mellon Arena (17,132) || 36–22–4 || 76
|-

|- style="background:#cfc;"
| 63 || 2 || 7:30 PM || Buffalo Sabres || 2–3 || Pittsburgh Penguins || Mellon Arena (17,132) || 37–22–4 || 78
|- style="background:#cfc;"
| 64 || 4 || 7:00 PM || Pittsburgh Penguins || 5–4 OT || New York Rangers || Madison Square Garden (IV) (18,200) || 38–22–4 || 80
|- style="background:#cfc;"
| 65 || 6 || 1:00 PM || Dallas Stars || 3–6 || Pittsburgh Penguins || Mellon Arena (17,132) || 39–22–4 || 82
|- style="background:#cfc;"
| 66 || 7 || 3:00 PM || Boston Bruins || 1–2 || Pittsburgh Penguins || Mellon Arena (17,132) || 40–22–4 || 84
|- style="background:#ffc;"
| 67 || 11 || 7:00 PM || Pittsburgh Penguins || 3–4 OT || Carolina Hurricanes || RBC Center (16,426) || 40–22–5 || 85
|- style="background:#fcf;"
| 68 || 12 || 7:00 PM || Pittsburgh Penguins || 1–3 || New Jersey Devils || Prudential Center (17,625) || 40–23–5 || 85
|- style="background:#cfc;"
| 69 || 14 || 5:00 PM || Pittsburgh Penguins || 2–1 || Tampa Bay Lightning || St. Pete Times Forum (20,230) || 41–23–5 || 87
|- style="background:#fcf;"
| 70 || 17 || 7:00 PM || Pittsburgh Penguins || 2–5 || New Jersey Devils || Prudential Center (17,625) || 41–24–5 || 87
|- style="background:#cfc;"
| 71 || 18 || 7:00 PM || Pittsburgh Penguins || 3–0 || Boston Bruins || TD Garden (17,565) || 42–24–5 || 89
|- style="background:#ffc;"
| 72 || 20 || 1:00 PM || Carolina Hurricanes || 3–2 OT || Pittsburgh Penguins || Mellon Arena (17,090) || 42–24–6 || 90
|- style="background:#fcf;"
| 73 || 22 || 7:00 PM || Pittsburgh Penguins || 1–3 || Detroit Red Wings || Joe Louis Arena (20,066) || 42–25–6 || 90
|- style="background:#ffc;"
| 74 || 24 || 7:00 PM || Pittsburgh Penguins || 3–4 SO || Washington Capitals || Verizon Center (18,277) || 42–25–7 || 91
|- style="background:#cfc;"
| 75 || 27 || 1:00 PM || Philadelphia Flyers || 1–4 || Pittsburgh Penguins || Mellon Arena (17,132) || 43–25–7 || 93
|- style="background:#cfc;"
| 76 || 28 || 5:00 PM || Toronto Maple Leafs || 4–5 SO || Pittsburgh Penguins || Mellon Arena (17,104) || 44–25–7 || 95
|- style="background:#fcf;"
| 77 || 31 || 7:30 PM || Tampa Bay Lightning || 2–0 || Pittsburgh Penguins || Mellon Arena (17,132) || 44–26–7 || 95
|-

|- style="background:#cfc;"
| 78 || 3 || 1:00 PM || Atlanta Thrashers || 3–4 OT || Pittsburgh Penguins || Mellon Arena (17,047) || 45–26–7 || 97
|- style="background:#fcf;"
| 79 || 6 || 7:30 PM || Washington Capitals || 6–3 || Pittsburgh Penguins || Mellon Arena (17,132) || 45–27–7 || 97
|- style="background:#cfc;"
| 80 || 8 || 7:30 PM || New York Islanders || 3–7 || Pittsburgh Penguins || Mellon Arena (17,132) || 46–27–7 || 99
|- style="background:#fcf;"
| 81 || 10 || 7:00 PM || Pittsburgh Penguins || 0–1 || Atlanta Thrashers || Philips Arena (18,959) || 46–28–7 || 99
|- style="background:#cfc;"
| 82 || 11 || 5:00 PM || Pittsburgh Penguins || 6–5 OT || New York Islanders || Nassau Veterans Memorial Coliseum (16,250) || 47–28–7 || 101
|-

|- style="text-align:center;"
| Legend:       = Win       = Loss       = OT/SO Loss

Standings
Atlantic Division

Eastern Conference

Detailed records
Final

Stanley Cup playoffs

The Penguins advanced to the Stanley Cup playoffs for the fourth consecutive season. They earned the fourth seed in the Eastern Conference and home-ice advantage in the opening round match-up with the Ottawa Senators. The Penguins defeated the Senators 4–2 and advanced to face the eighth-seeded Montreal Canadiens.

Eastern Conference Quarter-finals
The Penguins lost Game 1 of the series 5–4. The Penguins took an early 1–0 lead when Evgeni Malkin scored at 3:03 into the first period on the power play, but finished the first period trailing the Senators 2–1 after Peter Regin and Chris Neil both scored on rebounds. The Senators extended their lead to 3–1 early in the second period on the power play when Marc-Andre Fleury was caught out of the net on an odd bounce off of the end board in which Chris Kelly put into the open net. Malkin managed to decrease the deficit to 3–2 with his second power play goal of the night near the midway point of the second period. The Senators' lead was then re-extended the lead 3 minutes later when Erik Karlsson scored on the power play. Five minutes into the third period, Craig Adams scored on a backhand shot to decrease the Senators' lead back to one goal, but almost five minutes later, ex-Penguin Jarkko Ruutu scored what would be the game-winning goal. Alex Goligoski scored to make the score 5–4 with about a minute and a half off of a no-look feed from Sidney Crosby behind the net.

Looking to tie the series at 1–1 in Game 2, things did not get off on the right foot, with the Senators' Peter Regin scoring 18 seconds into the game to take an early 1–0 lead. Sidney Crosby leveled the game 8 minutes later, knocking in a rebound off of a Chris Kunitz shot. After a scoreless second period, Kris Letang scored the game-winner at 16:48 in the third period on a slap shot with the assist from Crosby, who passed to Letang after falling to his knees. The Penguins were able to fend off the Senators for the remainder of the game and leveled the series at 1–1.

The series then turned to Scotiabank Place, the home of the Senators, for Game 3. The Penguins started the scoring 1:17 into the first when Alexei Ponikarovsky beat Senators goalie Brian Elliott to give the Penguins a 1–0 lead. Peter Regin then scored late in the first period, but the goal was eventually disallowed due to the fact that the puck was scored by a clear kicking motion. Early in the second period, Mike Fisher scored on a power play to knot things up at 1–1. Evgeni Malkin and Sidney Crosby both went on to score goals in the second, with Crosby's coming on a power play to give the Penguins a 3–1 advantage after 2 periods. Bill Guerin extended the lead to 4–1 when he slotted home a shot on a breakaway. The Senators put on the pressure late and managed to put another behind Marc-Andre Fleury, where Matt Cullen, on the power play, lifted a shot over Fleury's glove from a wide angle. The Senators pulled their goalie on a late power play to extend their man advantage to two, but failed to convert any shots to goals. The final score was 4–2 to give the Penguins a 2–1 series lead.

Two days later, the two clubs met again in Ottawa for Game 4. The first goal of the game came 11:50 into the first period when Evgeni Malkin scored on a power play slap shot to take a 1–0 lead into the first intermission. In the second period, Ottawa turned the puck over near their blue line and Sergei Gonchar fed Chris Kunitz who then tapped the puck into the offensive zone where Sidney Crosby uncovered gathered the puck and slotted it home past Elliott to take a 2–0 lead. 12 seconds later, Maxime Talbot fed Matt Cooke from the corner boards to the front of the goal to increase the scoreline to 3–0. Things got ugly for Ottawa 13 seconds later, when Crosby came into the offensive zone virtually untouched and put a wrist shot top far corner to extend the lead to 4. Senators goaltender Brian Elliott was then pulled and replaced by Pascal Leclaire. After the change, Ottawa managed to score two goals from Chris Neil and Daniel Alfredsson to decrease the Penguin lead to 4–2. The goal scoring then continued in the period when Maxime Talbot scored a short handed goal. Matt Cullen for Ottawa then scored on a 5-on-3 power play and finally Chris Kunitz scored for Pittsburgh with around two minutes left in the period to go into the intermission with a 6–3 lead. In the final period, the Senators scored on another 5-on-3 power play, with Jordan Staal scoring the last goal of the game on a backhand shot to end any hopes of a Senators comeback. The final score was 7–4 and Pittsburgh took a 3–1 series lead back to Pittsburgh.

In game five the Penguins looked to wrap up the series on home ice. In the first period, the Senators took an early 2–0 lead with Mike Fisher scoring at 10:25 on a power play and Jarkko Ruutu put another one past Marc-Andre Fleury a little over a minute later. Kris Letang scored on a slap shot during a power play at 18:05 in the period to decrease the Senators lead to 2–1 going into the first intermission. In the second period, neither sides could manage to score until Chris Kunitz put a wrist shot past Pascal Leclaire to knot things up a 2–2 with about a minute and a half left in the second period. In the third period, Sidney Crosby scored at 9:01 on a beautiful wrist shot goal sitting on his backside in front of goal that looked like it could be the series clincher. The Senators quickly responded though at 10:24 when Peter Regin put a slap shot past Fleury to tie the game back up at 3–3. The game then went into overtime and a winner wasn't found until 7:06 into the third overtime when Matt Carkner's slap shot hit Fleury and trickled past the goal line to give the Senators a 4–3 win and decrease the Penguins advantage in the series to 3–2.

Eastern Conference Semi-finals
In the second round of the playoffs, the Penguins faced the Montreal Canadiens. Games 1 & 2 began in Pittsburgh. In game 1, the Penguins won 6-3. However, in game 2, Montreal stormed back victorious by a score of 3-1. Games 3 & 4 shifted to Montreal. Game 3 was in the Penguins' favor 2-0. The 2-1 series lead for the Penguins would be short lived as Montreal won game 4 3-2. Game 5 went back to Pittsburgh where the Penguins won 2-1. Unfortunately, in game 6, Montreal would win at home 4-3. Back in Pittsburgh, Montreal won game 7 5-2 and won the series 4-3.

Playoff log

|- style="background:#cfc;"
|-  style="text-align:center; background:#fcf;"
| 1 || April 14||Ottawa|| 5–4 ||Pittsburgh|| || Malkin, Malkin, Adams, Goligoski  || Regin, Neil, Kelly, Karlsson, Ruutu  || |Fleury (0–1) || 17,132 || 0–1 ||
|-  style="text-align:center; background:#cfc;"
| 2 || April 16||Ottawa|| 1–2 ||Pittsburgh||  || Crosby, Letang || Regin || Fleury (1–1) || 17,132 || 1–1 ||
|-  style="text-align:center; background:#cfc;"
| 3 || April 18||Pittsburgh|| 4–2 ||Ottawa|| || Ponikarovsky, Malkin, Crosby, Guerin || Fisher, Cullen || Fleury (2–1) || 20,119 || 2–1 ||
|-  style="text-align:center; background:#cfc;"
| 4 || April 20||Pittsburgh||  7–4 ||Ottawa || || Malkin, Crosby, Cooke, Crosby, Talbot, Kunitz, Staal || Neil, Alfredsson, Cullen, Spezza || Fleury (3–1) || 20,014 || 3–1 ||
|-  style="text-align:center; background:#ffc;"
| 5 || April 22|| Ottawa || 4–3 || Pittsburgh ||3OT|| Letang, Kunitz, Crosby || Fisher, Ruutu, Regin, Carkner (3OT) || Fleury (3–2) || 17,132 || 3–2 ||
|-  style="text-align:center; background:#cff;"
| 6 || April 24|| Pittsburgh || 4–3 || Ottawa || OT || Cooke, Guerin, Cooke, Dupuis (OT)  || Cullen, Neil, Alfredsson || Fleury (4–2)  || 20,122  || 4–2 ||
|-

|- style="background:#cfc;"
|-  style="text-align:center; background:#cfc;"
| 1 ||April 30||Montreal|| 3–6 ||Pittsburgh || || Gonchar, Staal, Letang, Adams, Goligoski, Guerin || Subban, Cammalleri, Gionta || Fleury (5–2) || 17,132 || 1–0 ||
|-  style="text-align:center; background:#fcf;"
| 2 ||May 2|| Montreal || 3–1 ||Pittsburgh || || Cooke || Gionta, Cammalleri, Cammalleri || Fleury (5–3) || 17,132  || 1–1 ||
|-  style="text-align:center; background:#cfc;"
| 3 ||May 4|| Pittsburgh || 2–0 ||Montreal || || Malkin, Dupuis || || Fleury (6–3)|| 21,273 ||2–1||
|-  style="text-align:center; background:#fcf;"
| 4 ||May 6|| Pittsburgh || 2–3  ||Montreal || || Talbot, Kunitz || Pyatt, Lapierre, Gionta || Fleury (6–4) || 21,273 || 2–2 ||
|-  style="text-align:center; background:#cfc;"
| 5 ||May 8||Montreal || 1–2 ||Pittsburgh || || Letang, Gonchar || Cammalleri  || Fleury (7–4) || 17,132 || 3–2 ||
|-  style="text-align:center; background:#fcf;"
| 6 ||May 10||Pittsburgh || 3–4  ||Montreal || || Crosby, Letang, Guerin || Cammalleri, Cammalleri, Spacek, Lapierre || Fleury (7–5) || 21,273 || 3–3 ||
|-  style="text-align:center; background:#fcf;"
| 7 ||May 12||Montreal || 5–2 ||Pittsburgh || || Kunitz, Staal || Gionta, Moore, Cammalleri, Moen, Gionta || Fleury (7–6) || 17,132 || 3–4 ||
|-

|- style="text-align:center;"
| Legend:       = Win       = Loss       = OT/SO Loss       = Playoff series winScorer of game-winning goal in italics''.

Player statistics
Skaters

Goaltenders

†Denotes player spent time with another team before joining Team.  Stats reflect time with the Team only.
‡Traded mid-season
Bold/italics denotes franchise record

Transactions
The Penguins have been involved in the following transactions during the 2009–10 season.

Trades

Free agents acquired

Free agents lost

Claimed from waivers

Lost from waivers

Notable achievements

Awards

Team awards

Milestones

Draft picks 

The 2009 NHL Entry Draft was the 47th NHL Entry Draft. It was held June 26–27 at the Bell Centre in Montreal, Quebec, the first NHL draft to be held in Montreal since 1992. At the Entry Draft, the Penguins made two trades to increase their number of overall picks, as several of their picks had been traded previously. With their first-round pick, the Penguins chose Simon Despres, 30th overall.

Notes on draft picks
 The Tampa Bay Lightning's third-round pick went to the Penguins as the result of a trade on June 28, 2008, that sent Gary Roberts and Ryan Malone to Tampa Bay in exchange for this pick (being conditional at the time of the trade). The condition – Ryan Malone is signed by Tampa Bay prior to the 2008–09 season – was converted on June 29, 2008.
 The Tampa Bay Lightning's fifth-round pick went to the Penguins as the result of a trade on October 1, 2008, that sent Michal Sersen to Tampa Bay for this pick.
 The Penguins' fifth-round pick (151st overall) was traded to the Toronto Maple Leafs on February 26, 2008, along with a second-round pick in 2008 in exchange for Hal Gill. The New York Rangers then acquired the pick from the Maple Leafs in July 2008, then the Penguins re-claimed their pick in a June 2009 trade that sent Chad Johnson to the Rangers.
 The Penguins' third-round pick was traded to the New York Islanders as a result of the conditional trade in which the Penguins acquired Bill Guerin on March 4, 2009. The trade sent the New York Islanders a conditional 2009 draft pick that became the third-round pick, because the Penguins advanced beyond the first round in the 2009 playoffs.

References

External links
2009–10 Pittsburgh Penguins season at ESPN
2009–10 Pittsburgh Penguins season at Hockey Reference

Pittsburgh Penguins seasons
Pittsburgh Penguins season, 2009-10
Pitts
Pitts
Pitts